North Tipperary was a county in Ireland. It was part of the Mid-West Region and was also located in the province of Munster. It was named after the town of Tipperary and consisted of 48% of the land area of the traditional county of Tipperary. North Tipperary County Council was the local authority for the county. In 2011, the population of the county was 70,322. It was abolished on 3 June 2014, merged with South Tipperary under a new Tipperary County Council.

Geography and political subdivisions

The county was part of the central plain of Ireland, but the diversified terrain contained several mountain ranges: the Arra Hills, Silvermine Mountains and the Devil's Bit. The county was landlocked. The southern part of the former county is drained by the River Suir; the northern part is drained by tributaries of the River Shannon which widens into Lough Derg. The centre of the county included much of the Golden Vale, a rich pastoral stretch of land in the Suir basin which extends into counties Limerick and Cork.

Its population centres included Nenagh (the county town), Borrisoleigh, Templemore, Thurles and Roscrea.

Baronies
There were six historic baronies in North Tipperary: Eliogarty,  Ikerrin,  Ormond Upper, Ormond Lower, Owney and Arra and Kilnamanagh Upper.

Civil parishes and townlands

Civil parishes in Ireland were delineated after the Down Survey as an intermediate subdivision, with multiple townlands per parish and multiple parishes per barony. The civil parishes had some use in local taxation and were included on the nineteenth century maps of the Ordnance Survey of Ireland. For poor law purposes district electoral divisions replaced the civil parishes in the mid-nineteenth century. There were 86 civil parishes in the county.

Politics and local government

The historic county of Tipperary was divided in 1898 when the administrative county of Tipperary (North Riding) was established. The North Riding had existed as a judicial county following the establishment of assize courts in 1838. The county's name changed to North Tipperary, and the council's name to North Tipperary County Council, under the Local Government Act 2001. The Council oversaw the county as an independent local government area. The council was made up of 21 representatives, directly elected through the system of proportional representation by means of a single transferable vote.

Under the provisions of the Local Government Act 1991, (Regional Authorities) (Establishment) Order, 1993, the territory of North Tipperary was defined as being in the Mid-West Region. This region was a NUTS III region of the European Union. The county of South Tipperary, by contrast, was part of the South-East Region. At a NUTS II level, both counties were in the Southern and Eastern region.

The council also claimed the title of The Premier County, a title which was usually taken to refer to the undivided territory of both north and south Tipperary. Following the division of the original county, North Tipperary was not granted its own coat of arms.

References

 
Munster
2014 disestablishments in Ireland
Former counties of Ireland